Manasology is a 2011 Indian Kannada-language romantic drama film directed by Deepak Aras and starring his sister Amulya and Rakesh. The film released to negative reviews and was a box office failure.

Plot 
The film's story is based on a real life incident that happened to a girl in Bangalore. She was stressed and in the hospital. She was in love with a boy whom she had never met with in real life and had only talked over the phone with.

Cast 
Amulya as Sihi
Rakesh as Manas
Achyuth Kumar as Sihi's father
Manjunath Raj
Sadhu Kokila

Production 
The film was shot in Bangalore and Mysore. The film completed most of its shooting by March of 2011.

Soundtrack 
The songs were composed by Anoop Seelin. The lyrics were written by Arasu Anthare and Ashok Maddur. The songs were sung by M. D. Pallavi, Ravindra Suregaavi, Ritisha Padmanabhan, Harsha, and Apoorva.

Reception 
A critic from Rediff.com gave the film a negative review criticizing the story, acting and music. A critic from IANS wrote that "Manasology suffers because of immature handling. Avoid it". A critic from Webdunia also gave the film a negative review.

Notes

References